Droitwich was the name of a constituency of the House of Commons of England in 1295, and again from 1554, then of the House of Commons of Great Britain from 1707 to 1800 and of the House of Commons of the Parliament of the United Kingdom from 1801 to 1918. It was a parliamentary borough in Worcestershire, represented by two Members of Parliament until 1832, and by one member from 1832 to 1885. The name was then transferred to a county constituency electing one MP from 1885 until 1918.

History
The borough consisted of three parishes and parts of two others in the town of Droitwich, a market town which for many centuries depended on the salt trade for its prosperity. When Droitwich's right to return MPs (which had been allowed to lapse) was restored in 1554, there was only one salt pit in the borough, and this became the basis of Droitwich's unique franchise: the right to vote was vested solely in those burgesses (members of the corporation) who owned shares in the pit giving them the right to draw brine. This was finally established by a resolution of the House of Commons in 1690; yet within a few years of this date that salt pit had dried up completely; by 1747 it was accepted that ownership of this property had no function except conferring the vote, and had to be proved by possession of the title deeds since there could be no evidence of an otherwise meaningless right which could not be exercised in practice.

Although these details of the franchise were unique to Droitwich, in practice it in many ways resembled a burgage borough, and like most of those came under the influence of a local magnate. The Foley family, Worcestershire industrialists, controlled Droitwich from the middle of the 17th century, although they seem to have allowed the townspeople to choose one of the two members at some periods. There was no contested election between 1747 and 1832, and by the time of the Reform Act it was estimated that only 28 men had the right to vote.

In 1831, the population of the borough was 2,487, and contained 533 houses. However, the boundaries were revised by the provisions of the Great Reform Act, taking in the rest of the town and some adjoining villages, so that the new constituency adjoined the borough of Worcester to the south. This increased the population to 5,992, which was enough for Droitwich to retain one of its two MPs, and there were 243 voters on the register for the first election under the reformed  franchise, in 1832.

There was a further slight enlargement of the boundaries to the east in 1868. However, the constituency was not big enough to keep its MP under the Third Reform Act, which came into effect at the general election of 1885. The borough was abolished, but the town's name was applied to the new county division in which it was placed, formally called The Mid or Droitwich Division of Worcestershire. This was a constituency with a considerable industrial vote, including the heavy industrial town of Stourbridge and the carpet-weaving town of Stourport-on-Severn, but also contained a substantial middle-class residential population, boosted by the votes of the Kidderminster freeholders (who were entitled to a vote in the county division even if they lived within the Kidderminster borough boundaries), as well as agricultural interests. With a popular sitting Liberal MP turning Liberal Unionist in 1886, this was enough to keep Droitwich a relatively safe Unionist seat except in the Liberal landslide of 1906.

The constituency was abolished in 1918, being divided between the redrawn Kidderminster and Evesham constituencies.

Members of Parliament

Droitwich borough

MPs 1554–1660
The constituency was re-established during the reign of Queen Mary I.  The following were members of Parliament during the succeeding period:

MPs 1660–1832

MPs 1832–1885

Mid or Droitwich Division of Worcestershire

MPs 1885–1918

Election results

Elections in the 1830s

On petition, Barneby's tally was reduced to 125, and Foley's to 124.

Elections in the 1840s

Elections in the 1850s
Pakington was appointed Secretary of State for War and the Colonies, requiring a by-election.

Pakington was appointed First Lord of the Admiralty, requiring a by-election.

Elections in the 1860s

Pakington was appointed First Lord of the Admiralty, requiring a by-election.

Pakington was appointed Secretary of State for War, requiring a by-election.

Elections in the 1870s

Elections in the 1880s

Elections in the 1890s

Elections in the 1900s

Elections in the 1910s 

General Election 1914–15:

Another General Election was required to take place before the end of 1915. The political parties had been making preparations for an election to take place and by the July 1914, the following candidates had been selected; 
Unionist: John Lyttelton
Liberal: Clifford H Brookes

References 

 D Brunton & D H Pennington, Members of the Long Parliament (London: George Allen & Unwin, 1954)
 F W S Craig, "British Parliamentary Election Results 1832–1885" (2nd edition, Aldershot: Parliamentary Research Services, 1989)
 Michael Kinnear, The British Voter (London: BH Batsford, Ltd, 1968)
 Henry Pelling, Social Geography of British Elections 1885–1910 (London: Macmillan, 1967)
 J Holladay Philbin, Parliamentary Representation 1832 – England and Wales (New Haven: Yale University Press, 1965)
 Edward Porritt and Annie G Porritt, The Unreformed House of Commons (Cambridge University Press, 1903)
 Frederic A Youngs, jr, "Guide to the Local Administrative Units of England, Vol II" (London: Royal Historical Society, 1991)

Droitwich Spa
Parliamentary constituencies in Worcestershire (historic)
Constituencies of the Parliament of the United Kingdom established in 1295
Constituencies of the Parliament of the United Kingdom disestablished in 1918